

Wilhelm Crisolli (20 January 1895 – 12 September 1944) was a German general in the Wehrmacht in World War II who commanded several divisions. He was a recipient of the Knight's Cross of the Iron Cross of Nazi Germany. Crisolli was killed 12 September 1944 by members of the Italian resistance. He was posthumously promoted to the rank of Generalleutnant.

Awards and decorations
 Iron Cross (1939) 2nd Class (26 September 1939) & 1st Class (8 October 1939)
 Knight's Cross of the Iron Cross on 15 July 1941 as Oberstleutnant and commander of Schützen-Regiment 8

References

Citations

Bibliography

 
 

1895 births
1944 deaths
Military personnel from Berlin
German people of Italian descent
Lieutenant generals of the German Army (Wehrmacht)
German Army personnel of World War I
Prussian Army personnel
Recipients of the clasp to the Iron Cross, 1st class
Recipients of the Knight's Cross of the Iron Cross
German Army personnel killed in World War II
People from the Province of Brandenburg
German Army generals of World War II